The Festival de La Roque-d'Anthéron is an international piano festival, founded in 1980 by Paul Onoratini (1920–2010), then mayor of La Roque-d'Anthéron and , then an intern at the Regional Directorate of Cultural Affairs, seeking to create a piano festival.

Held in the open air every summer in the park of the Château de Florans, it is now recognised as one of the major musical events in Europe. Some newspapers call it the "Mecca of the piano".

Interprets 
It is the meeting place for all pianistic talents, bringing together both new young talents and those whose reputation is well established.

The invited artists include Martha Argerich, Nelson Freire, Boris Berezovsky, Youri Egorov, Evgeny Kissin, Zhu Xiao-Mei, François-Frédéric Guy, Claire Désert, Nikolai Lugansky, Valentina Igoshina, Brigitte Engerer, Arcadi Volodos, Anne Queffélec, Alexandre Tharaud, Marie-Josèphe Jude, Hélène Grimaud, Mauricio Vallina, come regularly to perform at this festival.

Although the festival is centered on the piano, other instrumentalists sometimes join the stage, in orchestra formations such as the Concerto Köln and the Orchestre de Chambre de Lausanne, or in chamber formation (Gautier and Renaud Capuçon, Trio Wanderer...), as well as various baroques ensembles, jazz and electronic music composers...

The piano is sometimes also replaced by a harpsichord, an organ, a pianoforte, a clavicord or even a toy piano...

The "ensembles in residence" are small chamber music ensembles made up of young musicians who came to La Roque-d'Anthéron to study during the masterclasses of the great masters of the piano. They also perform in various surrounding villages, La route de la Durance aux Alpilles, during free concerts to discover these artists of tomorrow.

Concerts take place at various locations on the site, not always in the village itself:

Concert locations 
 Parc du Château de Florans: Clairière converted into an outdoor auditorium, it is the key site of the festival.
 Théâtre Forbin: Another outdoor auditorium, located in parc Florans, is designed for a smaller audience and its concerts, only during the day, give way to the new generation of pianists. 
 Silvacane Abbey: In the cloister of the nave of the abbey, are mainly held concerts of Baroque music. 
 
 Église de La Roque-d'Anthéron
 Étang des Aulnes: This site is located in Saint-Martin-de-Crau, 60 km from La Roque d'Anthéron. This is another open-air auditorium with a remarkable setting and acoustics
 Carrières (quarries) of Rognes: In this natural stone setting, 9 km from La Roque-d'Anthéron, concerts of jazz, 20th century piano music and electronic music are held.
 Théâtre des terrasses of Gordes 
 Église Notre-Dame de Beaulieu of Cucuron, especially for the pipe organ of the church.

References

External links 

 Official website
 Festival de La Roque-d'Anthénon (France Musique)
 Festival de La Roque-d'Anthénon (France Culture)
 Festival de La Roque-d'Anthénon (France Info)
 Francesco Libetta plays at La Roque d'Anthéron (COMPLETE RECITAL), 26 July 2002 (YouTube) 

 

Classical music festivals in France
Piano
Provence-Alpes-Côte d'Azur
Bouches-du-Rhône